The Bolitho novels are a series of nautical war novels written by British author Douglas Reeman (using the pseudonym Alexander Kent). They focus on the military careers of the fictional Richard Bolitho and Adam Bolitho in the Royal Navy, from the time of the American Revolution past the Napoleonic Era.

Richard Bolitho

Richard Bolitho is a fictional Royal Navy officer who is the main character in Reeman's novels. Bolitho was born in 1756 in Falmouth, Cornwall, in Great Britain, the second son of a prestigious naval family. He joined the navy in 1768 and served in the wars against France and the United States. He was promoted to lieutenant in 1774, captain in 1782, and admiral in 1812. He died in action against the French in 1815. He played a significant role in driving the Americans back to Brooklyn Heights in 1776, helping to secure a decisive British victory in the largest battle of the entire American Revolution.

The name Bolitho is a common Cornish surname, but Reeman says that he borrowed the name Richard Bolitho from a real person, "a distinguished old chap" he had met in the Channel Islands when he sailed his boat there. Reeman also states that the real Richard Bolitho was the brother of the Lord Lieutenant of Cornwall.

Among his fellow officers, Bolitho is known for his tactical ingenuity, his daring, and his disregard of both convention and political expediency. He rises to high rank—despite the opposition of less competent men—because of his ability to win crucial victories against seemingly impossible odds. Among the men of the fleet, Bolitho is known as a demanding but scrupulously fair and humane captain. The men sometimes refer to him, though never to his face, as "Equality Dick". His reputation as a paragon of decency in a brutal world creates a fierce sense of loyalty among those who serve under him.

Officers and men who serve under Bolitho frequently choose, when given the chance, to do so again. Ships in the squadrons he commands as a senior officer are frequently commanded by men who had served as his lieutenants when he was a captain. His most lasting relationships are with Thomas Herrick—a fellow officer and his oldest friend—and John Allday, a former Cornish shepherd who became Bolitho's coxswain and de facto bodyguard.

Bolitho had a number of romances. One of the first was Viola Raymond, the wife of an English diplomat. She died while Bolitho and a small number of his crew were stranded in a boat in the tropics, but it was her courage and sacrifice that rallied the crew. Bolitho married twice. His first wife, Cheney Seton, died in a carriage accident whilst carrying their unborn child. His relationship with the second, Belinda, the mother of his child Elizabeth, deteriorated when it became clear that she was nothing like the person he thought he married and was a very selfish individual. Estranged from her and his daughter, he carried on an increasingly public affair with Lady Catherine Somervell, who was his wife in all but name until his death.

Douglas Reeman uses some real locations as settings for his stories. The fictitious Bolitho ancestral home near Falmouth, Cornwall was inspired by a house which Reeman saw and photographed in the 1960s at Philleigh near the King Harry Ferry in Cornwall. In reality, the house is not near Falmouth at all, so Reeman "relocated" it for his novels. However, the Church of King Charles the Martyr, which is mentioned in the books, really does exist in Falmouth.

Reeman's own Royal Navy career and lifelong interest in sailing informed his seafaring novels. He saw active service with the Royal Navy during the Second World War, serving in the North Sea, Arctic, Atlantic and Mediterranean campaigns. Starting as a midshipman on destroyers, he later transferred to motor torpedo boats, where he was twice mentioned in dispatches.

Adam Bolitho
Adam Bolitho is a fictional Royal Navy officer who is another main character in Reeman's novels, succeeding the previous main character, Richard Bolitho.

In Enemy in Sight, Richard Bolitho is joined by his nephew Adam Pascoe, who is later renamed Adam Bolitho when he becomes Richard's heir. Adam, the only son of Richard's disgraced older brother Hugh, was born in 1780 in Penzance, Cornwall, shortly after his father joined the revolution in America. Having been sent to Richard at the age of 14 by his dying mother, he joined the Royal Navy, rising through the ranks to establish himself as a daring and resourceful frigate captain, as his uncle had once done.

Adam's role in the series steadily increases as Richard ages and achieves high rank. After Richard's death, he becomes the principal character in the series.

Books in the series

Several omnibus editions have also been released which collect multiple books from the series into one volume:

Ships in which Bolitho serves

References

Douglas Reeman's website on the series

See also

 Horatio Hornblower
 Douglas Reeman

 
Novels set on ships
Cornish culture
Works published under a pseudonym

de:Richard Bolitho